The 1947–48 Toronto Maple Leafs season involved winning the Stanley Cup.

Offseason

Regular season

Final standings

Record vs. opponents

Schedule and results

Player statistics

Regular season
Scoring

Goaltending

Playoffs
Scoring

Goaltending

Playoffs

Stanley Cup Finals
This was the debut series for Detroit's Gordie Howe, and the last for Toronto's Syl Apps who retired after the series.

Detroit Red Wings vs. Toronto Maple Leafs

Toronto wins best-of-seven series 4–0.

Awards and records
 Prince of Wales Trophy
 Vezina Trophy: || Turk Broda
 Turk Broda, Goaltender, NHL First Team All-Star

Transactions
May 15, 1947: Traded Buck Jones and Nick Knott to the Tulsa Oilers of the USHL for cash
October 5, 1947: Traded Gordie Bell to the Washington Lions of the AHL for cash
November 2, 1947: Acquired Max Bentley and Cy Thomas from the Chicago Black Hawks for Gus Bodnar, Gaye Stewart, Bob Goldham, Bud Poile and Ernie Dickens

References
Maple Leafs on Hockey Database
Maple Leafs on Database Hockey

Stanley Cup championship seasons
Toronto Maple Leafs seasons
Toronto
Tor
1
Toronto Maple Leafs
Toronto Maple Leafs